Jamal Olasewere (born September 16, 1991) is a Nigerian American professional basketball player for Pistoia Basket 2000 of the Italian Serie A2. He completed his college career at Long Island University, where he was an All-American and Conference Player of the Year.

College career
Olasewere, a 6'7" forward from Silver Spring, Maryland attended Springbrook High School and chose Long Island for college.  There, he was a four-year starter and led the Blackbirds to three consecutive NCAA tournament bids from 2011 to 2013.  As a senior, Olasewere averaged 18.9 points and 8.6 rebounds per game and was named Northeast Conference player of the year and an honorable mention All-American by the Associated Press.  For his career, Olasewere scored a school-record 1,871 points and collected 964 rebounds.

Professional career
In August 2013, Olasewere signed a one-year deal with the Italian League club Vanoli Cremona.

In August 2019, he signed with Úrvalsdeild karla club Grindavík. On January 9, 2020, the team released him from his contract due to injuries. In 10 games, he averaged 18 points and 7 rebounds per game.

On July 5, 2020, he has signed with Eurobasket Roma of the Italian Serie A2. Olasewere averaged 15.8 points, 6.4 rebounds, and 1.5 assists per game. On August 17, 2021, he signed with Pistoia Basket 2000.

Nigerian national team
Olasewere has also been a member of the senior men's Nigerian national basketball team. He played at the 2015 FIBA Africa Championship where they won the championship.

References

External links
Eurobasket.com Profile
LIU Athletic Profile

1991 births
Living people
American expatriate basketball people in Belgium
American expatriate basketball people in Iceland
American expatriate basketball people in Israel
American expatriate basketball people in Italy
American people of Nigerian descent
American people of Yoruba descent
American men's basketball players
Basketball players from Maryland
Blu Basket 1971 players
Grindavík men's basketball players
LIU Brooklyn Blackbirds men's basketball players
Nigerian expatriate basketball people in Israel
Nigerian expatriate basketball people in Italy
Nigerian men's basketball players
Pallacanestro Virtus Roma players
People from Silver Spring, Maryland
Power forwards (basketball)
RBC Pepinster players
Small forwards
Sportspeople from Montgomery County, Maryland
Úrvalsdeild karla (basketball) players
Yoruba sportspeople